Vincent Karchi "Vince" Fong (born October 24, 1979) is an American politician serving in the California State Assembly. He is a Republican representing the newly redrawn 32nd district, encompassing much of southern and eastern Kern County including West Bakersfield, the Tehachapi Mountains, the southern Sierra Nevada, and the northwestern Mojave Desert, as well as portions of Tulare County including the city of Visalia.  Prior to 2022 redistricting Vince Fong represented the 34th district.  Prior to his election to the Assembly in 2016, Fong served as District Director to Minority Leader and Congressman Kevin McCarthy.

Early life  
Vince Fong was born in Bakersfield, California. Fong graduated from West High School.

Education 
In 2001, Fong earned a Bachelor of Arts degree in Political Science and Government from UCLA. In 2003, Fong earned a MPA degree in Public Affairs from Princeton University.

Career 
Fong started his career as an aide for Congressman Bill Thomas, who at the time was chair of the Ways and Means Committee. In Thomas's office, Fong focused on international trade policy and opening up markets for United States farmers and small businesses.

Fong then returned home to serve the residents of Kern County. For nearly a decade, he served as the District Director to House Minority Leader and Congressman Kevin McCarthy.

Fong has been active in Kern County nonprofits and community organizations. He has served as a board member for Goodwill Industries of South Central California, the Jim Burke Education Foundation and Honor Flight Kern County where he works to send WWII, Korean War and Vietnam Veterans to Washington, DC to see their memorials. In addition, Fong was an elected member of the Kern County Republican Central Committee and is a lifetime member of the NRA.

California State Assembly 
Vince Fong was first elected to the California State Assembly representing 34th district in 2016, earning 73.2% of the vote. He was re-elected in 2018 with 70.6% of the vote.  In 2022, Fong won the election unopposed for the newly drawn 32nd assembly district, which represents the majority of the prior 34th district that he previously represented.

Assemblyman Fong is currently the Vice Chair on the Transportation Committee in addition to his assignment on the Appropriations, Budget, Business and Professions, and Public Employment and Retirement Committees.

Election history

2016

2018

2020

2022

References

External links 
 
 Vince Fong's Campaign website
 Vince Fong at clubrunner.ca
 Vince Fong at ucla.edu

Republican Party members of the California State Assembly
Living people
21st-century American politicians
1979 births
United States congressional aides
California politicians of Chinese descent
University of California, Los Angeles alumni
Princeton School of Public and International Affairs alumni
Asian conservatism in the United States